The St. Francis Xavier X-Men football team represents the St. Francis Xavier University in Antigonish, Nova Scotia in the sport of Canadian football in U Sports. The X-Men program has been competing at the varsity level since 1954 and won the second ever Vanier Cup national championship in 1966. The team has played in two National Championship games overall when they were runners-up in 1996 and have won 15 conference championships in total.

Championships

National championships

Vanier Cup
 Champions: 1966
 Runner-Up: 1996

Semi-final championships

Atlantic Bowl
 Champions: 1959, 1960, 1961, 1963, 1996
 Runner-Up: 1958, 1962, 1967, 1978, 1982, 1983
 In 1983 the AUAA was in a dispute with the CIS (formerly CIAU) over the Atlantic Bowl being played at Saint Mary's, in Halifax, on annual basis. Calgary received a bye to the CIAU Championship game.

Uteck Bowl
 Runner-Up: 2015, 2018

Mitchell Bowl
 Runner-Up: 2016, 2021

Conference championships

Jewett Trophy (Loney Bowl)
 Champions: 1960, 1961, 1962, 1963, 1966, 1967, 1978, 1982, 1983, 1996, 2015, 2016, 2018, 2021, 2022
The X-Men have won the Atlantic Conference Championship 15 times and have been runners-up an additional 12 times.

Recent results

National award winners
J. P. Metras Trophy: Tony Grassa (1981), Mike Kushnir (1997)
Presidents' Trophy: Paul Frlan (1995), Adam MacDonald (2002), Hénoc Muamba (2010)
Peter Gorman Trophy: Joey Tynes (1979), Andre Arlain (1994), Paul Carty (1997), Jeremy Steeves (2001)
Frank Tindall Trophy: John Stevens (1997), Gary Waterman (2022)

X-Men in the CFL
In the 2011 CFL Draft, Hénoc Muamba became the first X-Men player to be selected first overall in the Canadian College Draft, having been drafted by the Winnipeg Blue Bombers.

As of the end of the 2022 CFL season, seven former X-Men players are on CFL teams' rosters:

Keiran Burnham, Calgary Stampeders
Kaion Julien-Grant, Montreal Alouettes
Gregor MacKellar, Toronto Argonauts
Hénoc Muamba, Toronto Argonauts
Kay Okafor, Hamilton Tiger-Cats
Gordon Whyte, Hamilton Tiger-Cats
Jonathan Zamora, Calgary Stampeders

References

External links
 

 
St. Francis Xavier University
U Sports football teams
St. Francis Xavier X-Men